Spears House is a historic house at 1235 United States Route 65 in Greenbrier, Arkansas.  It is a single-story frame structure, faced in rock veneer with cream-colored brick trim.  Built about 1946, it is basically Craftsman in style, with the stylistic of the regionally prominent African-American mason Silas Owens, Sr. seen in the use of cream-colored brick, arched openings, and herringbone stone patterns on the walls.

The house was listed on the National Register of Historic Places in 2005.

See also
National Register of Historic Places listings in Faulkner County, Arkansas

References

Houses on the National Register of Historic Places in Arkansas
Houses completed in 1946
Houses in Faulkner County, Arkansas
National Register of Historic Places in Faulkner County, Arkansas